NanoLab Nijmegen is a laboratory of Radboud University Nijmegen in Nederlands.

Its goal is to contribute to knowledge transfer between academia and industry to make new developments in nanoscience and technology accessible for enterprises. It is done mainly via research jobs and collaborative research projects with industry, workshops, and training. Many projects employ Scanning Probe Microscopy methods as the primary experimental approach.

The initiative is broadly based in the Institute for Molecules and Materials, next to the Scanning Tunneling Microscopy group. The groups Spectroscopy of Solids and Interfaces, Solid State Chemistry, Condensed Matter Science, Supramolecular Chemistry, and Molecular Materials are participating.

NanoLab Nijmegen has received funding from Europees Fonds for Regionale Ontwikkeling (EFRO) and NanoNed, a.o. The new NanoLab building was officially opened in March 2006 by the Commissaris van de Koningin Clemens Cornielje.

See also
 Radboud University Nijmegen

External links
 NanoLab Nijmegen
 Institute for Molecules and Materials
 Scanning Tunneling Microscopy group
 NanoNed, the Dutch nanontechnology programme of the Ministry of Economic Affairs

References 

Radboud University Nijmegen